1992 Kashima Antlers season

Team name
Club nameKashima Antlers FC
NicknameAntlers

Review and events

Competitions

Domestic results

Emperor's Cup

J.League Cup

Player statistics

Transfers

In:

Out:

Transfers during the season

In
none

Out
none

References

Other pages
 J. League official site
 Kashima Antlers official site

Kashima Antlers
Kashima Antlers seasons